Make Love to the Music is the title of a recording by Leon & Mary Russell, released in 1977 by Paradise Records. There were two CD re-releases one in 2007 by Wounded Bird Records and a second in 2012 by AIS Records.

Track listing
All tracks composed by Leon Russell; except where indicated
Side 1
1. "Easy Love" – 3:58
2. "Joyful Noise" – 3:38
3. "Now Now Boogie" (Gary Ogan, Russell) – 2:55
4. "Say You Will" (Ogan, Russell) – 3:38
5. "Make Love to the Music" – 3:54

Side 2
6. "Love Crazy" – 2:58
7. "Love is in Your Eyes" – 2:49
8. "Hold On to This Feeling" – 3:51
9. "Island in the Sun" – 5:55

Charts

Personnel
Karl Himmel (2, 8), Greg Thomas (1, 7), Gary Ogan (3, 4, 6, 9), Teddy Jack Eddy (5) - drums
Marty Grebb - saxophone
Mickey Raphael - harmonica
Ben Keith - dobro
Dave Miner (7) - percussion
Gary Ogan (4) - bass guitar
Technical
Gary Ogan - production assistant
Greg Branson - engineer
Jim McCrary - photography

References
All information from the LP liner notes.

1977 albums
Leon Russell albums
Albums produced by Leon Russell